DeWayne Patterson (born April 20, 1984) is a former American football safety. He was signed by the Utah Blaze as a free agent in 2011. Patterson was born in Redlands, California. He attended Chaffey College from 2003 through 2005 where he was named a preseason All-American. He attended Washington State University, where he lettered in Football at the safety position alongside former NFL players Eric Frampton and Husain Abdullah from 2005 through 2007.

Early life
Patterson attended Redlands High School, where he lettered three times in football, three times in track and field, and once in basketball. Served as a team captain as a senior and earned All-League and All-County honors…Led his team to a league title and a No. 2 state ranking with an 11-1 overall record while producing 85 tackles and two interceptions He was also captained the track and field squad and captured the league title in the long jump.

College career

Chaffey

2003
Registered 50 tackles, 12 tackles for loss and two interceptions.

2004
Patterson started the 2004 season being named a Preseason All-American. He collected 90 tackles and three interceptions on his way to an All-Foothill Conference first-team selection.

Patterson committed to Washington State University on January 5, 2005. Patterson was heavily recruited, as he also had two other FBS scholarship offers from BYU and UTEP.

Washington State

2005
Played in 10 games and started the first two contests of the season. Totaled 24 tackles with a 10-yard sack, one forced fumble and one pass breakup.

Professional career

Wenatchee Valley Venom
Played in 13 games with Wenatchee Valley Venom of the Indoor Football League and registered 58.0 tackles, including a nine-yard sack and 3.5 stops for losses totaling 25 yards. He also gained 45 yards on two interceptions and 25 yards on two fumble recoveries. In addition, he had 16 pass breakup and two forced fumbles.

Utah Blaze
He was signed by the Blaze as a free agent on October 4, 2010. He appeared in just one game and collected 5 tackles. He re-signed with the Blaze for the 2012 season.

References

External links
 Washington State Bio

Players of American football from California
Sportspeople from San Bernardino County, California
Utah Blaze players
Everett Raptors players
1984 births
Living people
People from Redlands, California
Washington State Cougars football players
Chaffey Panthers football players
Wenatchee Valley Venom players